Fortune Makaringe (born 13 May 1993) is a South African professional soccer player who plays as a midfielder for South African Premier Division side Orlando Pirates. He also plays for the South Africa national football team. He previously played for Maritzburg United.

Club career
Born in Johannesburg, Makaringe started his career at Moroka Swallows before joining Maritzburg United. Makaringe signed for Orlando Pirates in the summer of 2019.

International career
Makaringe made his debut for South Africa on 3 June 2018 in a 0–0 draw against Madagascar, though South Africa went on to lose 4–3 on penalties. He was part of South Africa's preliminary 28-man squad for the 2019 Africa Cup of Nations but as not part of their final 23-man squad.

References

Living people
1993 births
Soccer players from Johannesburg
South African soccer players
Association football midfielders
Moroka Swallows F.C. players
Maritzburg United F.C. players
Orlando Pirates F.C. players
South Africa international soccer players
South African Premier Division players